Dysart is a village in County Westmeath, Ireland. It is located on the R391 road, to the west of Mullingar. Lough Ennell is located to the east.

The town is located in the civil parish of the same name. A national school, two pubs and a 19th Century Catholic chapel are located in the centre of the village.

See also 

 List of towns and villages in Ireland
 Dysart (civil parish)

References 

Towns and villages in County Westmeath